Christian Lind Thomsen (born 9 January 1985) is a Danish male badminton player.

Achievements

BWF International Challenge/Series
Men's Singles

 BWF International Challenge tournament
 BWF International Series tournament
 BWF Future Series tournament

References

External links
 

1985 births
Living people
People from Holstebro
Danish male badminton players
Sportspeople from the Central Denmark Region